Yom HaZikaron laShoah ve-laG'vurah, known colloquially in Israel and abroad as Yom HaShoah and in English as Holocaust Remembrance Day, or Holocaust Day, is observed as Israel's day of commemoration for the approximately six million Jews murdered in the Holocaust by Nazi Germany and its collaborators, and for the Jewish resistance in that period. In Israel, it is a national memorial day. The first official commemorations took place in 1951, and the observance of the day was anchored in a law passed by the Knesset in 1959. It is held on the 27th of Nisan (which falls in April or May), unless the 27th would be adjacent to the Jewish Sabbath, in which case the date is shifted by a day.

Origins

Rabbinate-instituted day (1949–1950)
The first Holocaust Remembrance Day in Israel took place on December 28, 1949, following a decision of the Chief Rabbinate of Israel that an annual memorial should take place on the Tenth of Tevet, a traditional day of mourning and fasting in the Hebrew calendar. The day was marked by the burial in a Jerusalem cemetery of ashes and bones of thousands of Jews brought from the Flossenbürg concentration camp and religious ceremonies held in honor of the victims. A radio program on the Holocaust was broadcast that evening. The following year, in December 1950, the Rabbinate, organizations of former European Jewish communities and the Israel Defense Forces held memorial ceremonies around the country; they mostly involved funerals, in which objects such as desecrated Torah scrolls and the bones and ashes of the dead brought from Europe were interred.

Knesset-instituted day (1951–1958)
In 1951, the Knesset began deliberations to choose a date for Holocaust Remembrance Day. On April 12, 1951, after also considering as possibilities the Tenth of Tevet, the 14th of Nisan, which is the day before Passover and the day on which the Warsaw Ghetto uprising (April 19, 1943) began, and September 1, the date on which the Second World War began, the Knesset passed a resolution establishing the 27 Nisan in the Hebrew calendar, a week after Passover, and eight days before Israel Independence Day as the annual Holocaust and Ghetto Uprising Remembrance Day.

On May 3, 1951, the first officially organized Holocaust Remembrance Day event was held at the Chamber of the Holocaust on Mount Zion; the Israel Postal Service issued a special commemorative envelope; and a bronze statue of Mordechai Anielewicz, the leader of the Warsaw Ghetto revolt, was unveiled at Yad Mordechai, a kibbutz named for him. From the following year, the lighting of six beacons in memory of the six million Jews murdered by the Nazis became a standard feature of the official commemoration of Holocaust Memorial Day.

Martyrs' and Heroes' Remembrance Day Law (1959)
On April 8, 1959, the Knesset officially established the day when it passed the Martyrs' and Heroes' Remembrance Day Law with the purpose of instituting an annual "commemoration of the disaster which the Nazis and their collaborators brought upon the Jewish people and the acts of heroism and revolt performed." The law was signed by the Prime Minister of Israel, David Ben-Gurion, and the President of Israel, Yitzhak Ben-Zvi. It established that the day would be observed by a two-minute silence when all work would come to a halt throughout the country, memorial gatherings and commemorative events in public and educational institutions would be held, flags would be flown at half mast, and programs relevant to the day would be presented on the radio and in places of entertainment. An amendment to the law in 1961 mandated that cafes, restaurants and clubs be closed on the day.

Commemoration

Israel

Date
The date is set in accordance with the Hebrew calendar, on 27 Nisan, so that it varies in regard to the Gregorian calendar. Observance of the day is moved back to the Thursday before, if 27 Nisan falls on a Friday (as in 2021), or forward a day, if 27 Nisan falls on a Sunday (to avoid adjacency with the Jewish Sabbath, as in 2024). The fixed Jewish calendar ensures 27 Nisan does not fall on Saturday.

Evening
Yom HaShoah opens in Israel at sundown in a state ceremony held in Warsaw Ghetto Square at Yad Vashem, the Holocaust Martyrs' and Heroes Authority, in Jerusalem. During the ceremony the national flag is lowered to half mast, the President and the Prime Minister both deliver speeches, Holocaust survivors light six torches symbolizing the approximately six million Jews murdered in the Holocaust and the Chief Rabbis recite prayers.

Daytime
On Yom HaShoah, ceremonies and services are held at schools, military bases and by other public and community organizations.

On the eve of Yom HaShoah and the day itself, places of public entertainment are closed by law. Israeli television airs Holocaust documentaries and Holocaust-related talk shows, and low-key songs are played on the radio. Flags on public buildings are flown at half mast. At 10:00, an air raid siren sounds throughout the country and Israelis are expected to observe two minutes of solemn reflection. Almost everyone stops what they are doing, including motorists who stop their cars in the middle of the road, standing beside their vehicles in silence as the siren is sounded.

Abroad 

Jewish communities and individuals throughout the world commemorate Yom HaShoah in synagogues as well as in the broader Jewish community. Many hold their commemorative ceremonies on the closest Sunday to Yom HaShoah as a more practical day for people to attend, while some mark the day on April 19, the anniversary of the Warsaw Ghetto uprising. Jewish schools also hold Holocaust-related educational programs on or near Yom HaShoah.

Commemorations typically include memorial services and communal vigils and educational programs. These programs often include talks by Holocaust survivors (although this is becoming less common as time passes and there are fewer survivors who remain alive), candle-lighting ceremonies, the recitation of memorial prayers, the Mourner's Kaddish and appropriate songs and readings. Some communities read the names of Holocaust victims or show Holocaust-themed films.

Since 1988 in Poland, a memorial service has been held after a three-kilometer walk by thousands of participants from Auschwitz to Birkenau in what has become known as "The March of the Living".

Yom HaShoah is also commemorated by Australian Jews. In 2022, Treasurer Josh Frydenburg, who is Jewish, commemorated Yom HaShoah at the Melbourne Hebrew Congregation on its 180th anniversary.

Religious observances and liturgy
In the last few decades all the prayerbooks of Conservative and Reform Judaism have developed similar liturgies to be used on Yom HaShoah. The siddurim of these groups add passages that are meant to be added to standard weekday service, as well as stand-alone sections.  These liturgies generally include:

 Lighting of a candle (often each member of the congregation lights one)
 Modern poems, including "I believe in the sun even when it is not shining..."
 El Malei Rahamim (God, full of mercy, dwelling on high)
 Mourner's Kaddish

In response to the lack of liturgy dedicated to Yom HaShoah, Daniel Gross composed, in 2009, I Believe: A Shoah Requiem, a complete musical liturgy dedicated to the observance of Yom HaShoah. An a cappella oratorio scored for cantor, soprano solo, adult chorus and children's chorus, I Believe features several traditional prayer texts such as the Mourner's Kaddish (Kaddish Yatom) and the El Malei memorial prayer, and also includes the poetry of Paul Celan and Primo Levi. On April 7, 2013, I Believe had its world premiere presentation at Orchestra Hall at the Max M. Fisher Music Center in Detroit, Michigan.

Orthodox Judaism
While there are Orthodox Jews who commemorate the Holocaust on Yom HaShoah, others in the Orthodox community, especially Haredim, including Hasidim, remember the victims of the Holocaust in their daily prayers and on traditional days of mourning that were already in place before the Holocaust, such as Tisha B'Av in the summer, and the Tenth of Tevet in the winter, because in the Jewish tradition the month of Nisan is considered a joyous month associated with Passover and messianic redemption. The moment of silence is by some purposely ignored because of the non-Jewish origins of this sort of memorial.<ref>{{Cite web|title = Debates Parlamentares - Diário 039, p. 2 (1912-02-13)|url = http://debates.parlamento.pt/catalogo/r1/cs/01/01/02/039/1912-02-13/2|website = debates.parlamento.pt|access-date = 2016-01-01 |quote=O Sr. Presidente: Tenho de cumprir o doloroso dever de comunicar ao Senado o falecimento, no Rio de Janeiro, do Barão do Rio Branco, que ilustrou grandemente o seu nome, tanto pela maneira como dirigiu os negócios diplomáticos do Brasil como pela erudição manifestada nas suas obras, e que muito honrou a sua origem lusitana. (Apoiados gerais). Além disso devemos lembrar-nos de que o Barão do Rio Branco era Ministro do Govêrno que primeiro reconheceu a República Portuguesa. (Apoiados gerais). Por consideração, pois, para com todos êstes aspectos daquele vulto notável, proponho que a sessão seja interrompida durante 10 minutos, conservando-se os Srs. Senadores sentados nos seus lugares e silenciosos durante êsse espaço de tempo.' (Apoiados gerais). Às 14 horas e 45 minutos foi, portanto, suspensa a sessão, reabrindo-se às 14 e 55 minutos. The President: I must fulfill the painful duty of communicating to the Senate the death in Rio de Janeiro of the baron of Rio Branco, who made his name illustrious with the manner in which he conducted the diplomatic business of Brazil as well as with the erudition manifested in his work, and who honored his Portuguese origins with grandeur. Furthermore, we must remember that the baron of Rio Branco was a Minister of the government that first recognized the Portuguese Republic. Thus, in consideration of all these aspects related to this notable figure, I propose that the session be interrupted for 10 minutes, with the Senators remaining on their seats in silence for that period of time. At 14 hours and 45 minutes the session was therefore suspended, reopening at 14 hours and 55 minutes.}}</ref> Some ultra-Orthodox rabbis recommend adding piyyutim (religious poems) about the Holocaust to the liturgy of Tisha B’Av; some adherents follow this advice.

Conservative Judaism

In 1981, members of the Federation of Jewish Men's Clubs FJMC, a branch of the mainstream Conservative/Masorti movement, created a special memorial project specifically for Yom HaShoah.  A dedicated yahrzeit candle was conceived, with yellow wax and a barbed-wire Star of David logo reminiscent of the armbands Jews were forced to wear during the Holocaust.  This object has come to be known as the Yellow Candle (TM).  Approximately 200,000 candles are distributed around the world each year, along with relevant prayers and meditations.

In 1984, Conservative Rabbi David Golinkin wrote an article in Conservative Judaism journal suggesting a program of observance for the holiday, including fasting.  In his article he noted that while private fasts are indeed prohibited during the month of Nisan (a major Orthodox objection to the placement of the day), communal fasts for tragedies befalling Jewish communities had indeed been declared throughout the pre-Modern period.

Another prominent Conservative Jewish figure shared the Orthodox sentiment about not adopting Yom HaShoah. Ismar Schorsch, former Chancellor of Conservative Judaism's Jewish Theological Seminary of America held that Holocaust commemoration should take place on Tisha b'Av.

The Masorti (Conservative) movement in Israel has created Megillat HaShoah, a scroll and liturgical reading for Yom HaShoah.  This publication was a joint project of Jewish leaders in Israel, the United States and Canada.

In 2011, the FJMC introduced a related Yellow Candle concept for use on Kristallnacht (The Night of Shattered Glass), November 9–10, commemorating the first organised Nazi pogrom of Jews in 1938, and other important Shoah commemoration dates. Called the Ner Katan, FJMC's new version consists of six Yellow Candles provided for communal observances and ceremonies.

More recently Conservative rabbis and lay leaders in the US, Israel and Canada collaborated to write Megillat Hashoah (The Holocaust Scroll). It contains personal recollections of Holocaust survivors. A responsum was written by Rabbi David Golinkin expressing the view that not only is it legitimate for the modern Jewish community to write a new scroll of mourning, it was also incumbent to do so.

Reform Judaism
Reform Jewish congregations have tended to commemorate the memory of the Holocaust either on International Holocaust Remembrance Day or on Yom HaShoah. These commemorations of the Holocaust have used a ceremony that is loosely modeled after a Passover Seder. The focus of the seder has changed with time. The earlier Holocaust seders commemorated the losses of the Holocaust through a reenactment events from the Holocaust and through the lighting of six yahrzeit candles to reflect the approximately 6 million Jews murdered. More modern Haggadot for Yom HaShoah, such as Gathering from the Whirlwind, have concentrated on renewal, remembrance, and the continuity of Jewish life.

In 1988 the American Reform movement published Six Days of Destruction'' (Elie Wiesel and Rabbi Albert Friedlander). Narratives from Holocaust survivors are juxtaposed with the six days of creation found in Genesis.

Gregorian dates
Upcoming dates of observance:
 2023: Tuesday, April 18
 2024: Monday, May 6
 2025: Wednesday, April 23

See also
 Days of Remembrance of the Victims of the Holocaust
 Holocaust Memorial Day

References

External links 

 Yom Hashoah on the Yad Vashem website
 Yom HaShoah from the Israeli Knesset 
 Yom HaShoah from the Israeli Knesset 
 The Forum for Yom HaShoah (UK)
 Holocaust Memorial Day (Yom Ha-Shoah) at the Jewish Virtual Library
 27th of Nisan as standard dates on HebCal
 United States Holocaust Memorial Museum – Days of Remembrance

Holocaust remembrance days
Jewish observances
Nisan observances
Observances honoring victims of war
Public holidays in Israel
Articles containing video clips